Aeorestes is a genus or subgenus of vesper bat commonly known as the hoary bats. As a genus, it includes species that were formerly included in the genus Lasiurus.

Taxonomy

The genus was initially described by Austrian zoologist Leopold Fitzinger in 1870.
Based on genetic divergence within Lasiurus, Baird et al. recommended that the hoary bats be recognized as a separate genus.
They additionally recommended that Dasypterus should be elevated from a subgenus to a genus as well.
However, as Lasiurus was previously monophyletic, some authors see the creation of two new genera—Aeorestes and Dasypterus—as a solution to something that was not a problem.
Teta advocated using Aeorestes as a subgenus and retaining the usage of Dasypterus as such.

In a 2017 follow-up to their 2015 study, Baird et al. again expressed that Aeorestes, Dasypterus, and Lasiurus should be separate genera comprising the tribe Lasiurini. They stated that the genetic distance of the three genera was much greater than observed between other bat genera, on average. In contrast to the average of  12.0% inter-generic divergence reported from another study on bats, Aeorestes and Dasypterus varied 18.79%; Aeorestes and Lasiurus varied 19.05%; and Dasypterus and Lasiurus varied 19.79%.

Aeorestes split from Lasiurus approximately 17.99 Ma (million years ago).
A. villosissimus diverged from the hoary bat and the Hawaiian hoary bat approximately 4.61 Ma, while the latter two species split from each other 1.35 Ma.

Species
Based on Baird et al., Aeorestes contains the following species:
Hoary bat (A. cinereus)
Big red bat (A. egregius)
Hawaiian hoary bat (A. semotus)
South American hoary bat (A. villosissimus)

References

Bat genera
Taxa named by Leopold Fitzinger
Vesper bats